The 2021 PokerGO Tour was the first season of the PokerGO Tour and was presented by Guaranteed Rate. The season ran for 2021 with the first event beginning on January 28, and the final event concluding on December 21. 

By finishing on top of the 2021 PokerGO Tour leaderboard, Ali Imsirovic became the first-ever PokerGO Tour champion and was awarded the Guaranteed Rate Cup and $200,000 in prize money.

Leaderboard 
The points leader at the end of the 2021 PokerGO Tour season would be awarded the Guaranteed Rate Cup and $200,000 in prize money, while second place earned $100,000, and third place earned $50,000. The leaderboard is published on the PokerGO Tour website.

Schedule 
The full schedule and results for the 2021 PokerGO Tour is published on the website.

(#): This denotes the number of PokerGO Tour titles won at that point of 2021.

References 

Poker tournaments
2021 in poker